The Secret is the ninth book in the Animorphs series, written by K.A. Applegate. It is narrated by Cassie.

Plot summary

Cassie and the Animorphs discover from Ax and Tobias that the Yeerks have set up a dummy logging company, called Dapsen Logging Company, in the woods. The Yeerks want to destroy the forest in order to find the "Andalite bandits," whom they believe to be living there.  The Animorphs go to check it out, but are discovered, chased away, and shot at. Cassie and her father later find an injured skunk, that was hit by a Dracon beam in the fighting. Cassie's father finds that there is a good chance that the skunk had recently given birth, and Cassie is stricken with guilt.

Cassie suggests to the others that they need to find out how the Yeerks got permission to cut trees in a National Forest. If they didn't have permission, the news media would bring attention to them, something they surely did not want. The group decides to go back and enter the logging camp to find this information. Tobias notices that there are termite tunnels in the building, and they decide to morph termites to get in. Jake causes a distraction by morphing into a wolf while the others (excluding Tobias) morph and enter the building. There is a brief episode where they are controlled by the termite queen's orders and lose control of themselves. Cassie kills the termite queen to free her friends and herself from the queen's control, but felt much guilt by it. The Animorphs get the information they need, disable the Yeerks' defenses, and escape unnoticed.

The Animorphs find out that there is a committee of three people who must decide on giving the logging operation a go. One has already voted yes and one has voted no; the other, a man called Farrand, was due to make a visit to the camp in order to make his decision.  The Animorphs decide to intercede when Farrand makes his visit, as the Yeerks will surely turn him into a Controller at that point to ensure an affirmative vote.  Meanwhile, Cassie is still concerned with the skunk babies and decides to look for them. Tobias is able to tell her where the litter of kits is, having found five and eaten one. Cassie rescues them and the Animorphs take over tending the kits, with Tobias doing much of the skunk-sitting while the other Animorphs are in school. Marco ends up naming the skunk kits after members of The Ramones, such as Joey, Johnny, Marky and C.J.

In the final showdown, the Yeerks capture Cassie and Farrand, but she morphs into a skunk and sprays all of the Controllers and Visser Three. Ax makes a bargain with Visser Three, offering information on how to get rid of the skunk smell in return for the release of Farrand.  Visser Three agrees, and Farrand is transported to a hospital. As soon as he can, Farrand makes a phone call to vote against the logging, and he will likely bring litigation against the company. In return for the release of the human, Ax tells the Yeerks that grape juice will remove the stink (instead of tomato juice, which at best masks the smell), and Tobias later reports that a pool of grape juice was made for Visser Three to soak in. Visser Three hasn't gotten rid of the skunk smell, and in addition is a "lovely, attractive shade of purple."

Morphs

References 

Secret, The
1997 American novels
1997 science fiction novels
Environmental fiction books